Iveta Benešová was the defending champion, but decided not to participate in the tournament.
Alberta Brianti won her first WTA singles title by defeating Simona Halep 6–4, 6–3 in the final.

Seeds

Qualifying

Draw

Finals

Top half

Bottom half

External links
Main Draw
Qualifying Draw

Grand Prix SAR La Princesse Lalla Meryem - Singles
Morocco Open
2011 in Moroccan tennis